Nubeoscincus glacialis is a species of skink found in Indonesia.

References

Nubeoscincus
Reptiles described in 2005
Reptiles of Indonesia
Endemic fauna of Indonesia
Taxa named by Allen Eddy Greer
Taxa named by Allen Allison
Taxa named by Harold Cogger